Yalavac (also, Yalavadzh) is a village and municipality in the Imishli Rayon of Azerbaijan.  It has a population of 2,879.

References 

Populated places in Imishli District